The Six-Day War (or ) or June War, also known as the 1967 Arab–Israeli War or Third Arab–Israeli War, was fought between Israel and a coalition of Arab states (primarily Egypt, Syria, and Jordan) from 5 to 10 June 1967.

Escalated hostilities broke out amid poor relations between Israel and its Arab neighbours following the 1949 Armistice Agreements, which were signed at the end of the First Arab–Israeli War. Earlier, in 1956, regional tensions over the Straits of Tiran escalated in what became known as the Suez Crisis, when Israel invaded Egypt over the Egyptian closure of maritime passageways to Israeli shipping, ultimately resulting in the re-opening of the Straits of Tiran to Israel as well as the deployment of the United Nations Emergency Force (UNEF) along the Egypt–Israel border. In the months prior to the outbreak of the Six-Day War in June 1967, tensions again became dangerously heightened: Israel reiterated its post-1956 position that another Egyptian closure of the Straits of Tiran to Israeli shipping would be a definite . In May 1967, Egyptian president Gamal Abdel Nasser announced that the Straits of Tiran would again be closed to Israeli vessels. He subsequently mobilized the Egyptian military along the border with Israel, and also ordered the immediate withdrawal of all UNEF personnel.

On 5 June 1967, as the UNEF was in the process of leaving the zone, Israel launched a series of pre-emptive airstrikes against Egyptian airfields and other facilities, launching its war effort. Egyptian forces were caught by surprise, and nearly the entirety of Egypt's military aerial assets were destroyed, giving Israel the advantage of air supremacy. Simultaneously, the Israeli military launched a ground offensive into Egypt's Sinai Peninsula as well as the Egyptian-occupied Gaza Strip. After some initial resistance, Nasser ordered an evacuation of the Sinai Peninsula; by the sixth day of the conflict, Israel had occupied the entire Sinai Peninsula. Jordan, which had entered into a defense pact with Egypt just a week before the war began, did not take on an all-out offensive role against Israel. However, the Jordanians did launch attacks against Israeli forces to slow Israel's advance. On the fifth day, Syria joined the war by shelling Israeli positions in the north.

Egypt and Jordan agreed to a ceasefire on 8 June, and Syria on 9 June, and it was signed with Israel on 11 June. The Six-Day War resulted in more than 20,000 Arab casualties, with Israeli losses standing at fewer than 1,000 casualties. Alongside the combatant casualties were the deaths of 20 Israeli civilian killed in Arab forces air strikes on Jerusalem, 15 UN peacekeepers killed by Israeli strikes in the Sinai at the outset of the war, and 34 US personnel killed in the USS Liberty incident in which Israeli air forces struck a United States Navy technical research ship.

At the time of the cessation of hostilities, Israel had seized Syria's Golan Heights, the Jordanian-annexed West Bank (including East Jerusalem), and Egypt's Sinai Peninsula as well as the Egyptian-occupied Gaza Strip. The displacement of civilian populations as a result of the Six-Day War would have long-term consequences, as around 280,000 to 325,000 Palestinians and 100,000 Syrians fled or were expelled from the West Bank and the Golan Heights, respectively. Nasser resigned in shame following Israel's victory, but was later reinstated following a series of protests across Egypt. In the aftermath of the conflict, Egypt closed the Suez Canal until 1975, providing a trigger for the 1970s energy crisis and 1973 oil crisis due to the impact on oil deliveries coming from the Middle East to Europe through the Suez Canal.

Background 

After the 1956 Suez Crisis, Egypt agreed to the stationing of a United Nations Emergency Force (UNEF) in the Sinai to ensure all parties would comply with the 1949 Armistice Agreements. In the following years there were numerous minor border clashes between Israel and its Arab neighbours, particularly Syria. In early November 1966, Syria signed a mutual defence agreement with Egypt. Soon after this, in response to Palestine Liberation Organisation (PLO) guerilla activity, including a mine attack that left three dead, the Israeli Defence Force (IDF) attacked the village of as-Samu in the Jordanian-ruled West Bank. Jordanian units that engaged the Israelis were quickly beaten back. King Hussein of Jordan criticized Egyptian President Gamal Abdel Nasser for failing to come to Jordan's aid, and "hiding behind UNEF skirts".

In May 1967, Nasser received false reports from the Soviet Union that Israel was massing on the Syrian border. Nasser began massing his troops in two defensive lines in the Sinai Peninsula on Israel's border (16 May), expelled the UNEF force from Gaza and Sinai (19 May) and took over UNEF positions at Sharm el-Sheikh, overlooking the Straits of Tiran. Israel repeated declarations it had made in 1957 that any closure of the Straits would be considered an act of war, or justification for war, but Nasser closed the Straits to Israeli shipping on 22–23 May. After the war, U.S. President Lyndon Johnson commented:

On 30 May, Jordan and Egypt signed a defence pact. The following day, at Jordan's invitation, the Iraqi army began deploying troops and armoured units in Jordan. They were later reinforced by an Egyptian contingent. On 1 June, Israel formed a National Unity Government by widening its cabinet, and on 4 June the decision was made to go to war. The next morning, Israel launched Operation Focus, a large-scale, surprise air strike that launched the Six-Day War.

Military preparation 
Before the war, Israeli pilots and ground crews had trained extensively in rapid refitting of aircraft returning from sorties, enabling a single aircraft to sortie up to four times a day, as opposed to the norm in Arab air forces of one or two sorties per day. This enabled the Israeli Air Force (IAF) to send several attack waves against Egyptian airfields on the first day of the war, overwhelming the Egyptian Air Force and allowed it to knock out other Arab air forces on the same day. This has contributed to the Arab belief that the IAF was helped by foreign air forces (see Controversies relating to the Six-Day War). Pilots were extensively schooled about their targets, were forced to memorise every single detail, and rehearsed the operation multiple times on dummy runways in total secrecy.

The Egyptians had constructed fortified defences in the Sinai. These designs were based on the assumption that an attack would come along the few roads leading through the desert, rather than through the difficult desert terrain. The Israelis chose not to risk attacking the Egyptian defences head-on, and instead surprised them from an unexpected direction.

James Reston, writing in The New York Times on 23 May 1967, noted, "In; discipline, training, morale, equipment and general competence his [Nasser's] army and the other Arab forces, without the direct assistance of the Soviet Union, are no match for the Israelis. ... Even with 50,000 troops and the best of his generals and air force in Yemen, he has not been able to work his way in that small and primitive country, and even his effort to help the Congo rebels was a flop."

On the eve of the war, Israel believed it could win a war in 3–4 days. The United States estimated Israel would need 7–10 days to win, with British estimates supporting the U.S. view.

Armies and weapons

Armies 
The Israeli army had a total strength, including reservists, of 264,000, though this number could not be sustained during a long conflict, as the reservists were vital to civilian life.

Against Jordan's forces on the West Bank, Israel deployed about 40,000 troops and 200 tanks (eight brigades). Israeli Central Command forces consisted of five brigades. The first two were permanently stationed near Jerusalem and were the Jerusalem Brigade and the mechanized Harel Brigade. Mordechai Gur's 55th Paratroopers Brigade was summoned from the Sinai front. The 10th Armored Brigade was stationed north of the West Bank. The Israeli Northern Command comprised a division of three brigades led by Major General Elad Peled which was stationed in the Jezreel Valley to the north of the West Bank.

On the eve of the war, Egypt massed approximately 100,000 of its 160,000 troops in the Sinai, including all seven of its divisions (four infantry, two armoured and one mechanized), four independent infantry brigades and four independent armoured brigades. Over a third of these soldiers were veterans of Egypt's continuing intervention into the North Yemen Civil War and another third were reservists. These forces had 950 tanks, 1,100 APCs, and more than 1,000 artillery pieces.

Syria's army had a total strength of 75,000 and was deployed along the border with Israel. Professor David W. Lesch wrote that "One would be hard-pressed to find a military less prepared for war with a clearly superior foe" since Syria's army had been decimated in the months and years prior through coups and attempted coups that had resulted in a series of purges, fracturings and uprisings within the armed forces.

The Jordanian Armed Forces included 11 brigades, totalling 55,000 troops. Nine brigades (45,000 troops, 270 tanks, 200 artillery pieces) were deployed in the West Bank, including the elite armoured 40th, and two in the Jordan Valley. They possessed sizable numbers of M113 APCs and were equipped with some 300 modern Western tanks, 250 of which were U.S. M48 Pattons. They also had 12 battalions of artillery, six batteries of 81 mm and 120 mm mortars, a paratrooper battalion trained in the new U.S.-built school and a new battalion of mechanized infantry. The Jordanian Army was a long-term-service, professional army, relatively well-equipped and well-trained. Israeli post-war briefings said that the Jordanian staff acted professionally, but was always left "half a step" behind by the Israeli moves. The small Royal Jordanian Air Force consisted of only 24 British-made Hawker Hunter fighters, six transport aircraft and two helicopters. According to the Israelis, the Hawker Hunter was essentially on par with the French-built Dassault Mirage III – the IAF's best plane.

One hundred Iraqi tanks and an infantry division were readied near the Jordanian border. Two squadrons of Iraqi fighter-aircraft, Hawker Hunters and MiG 21s, were rebased adjacent to the Jordanian border.

In the weeks leading up to the Six-Day War, Saudi Arabia mobilized forces for deployment to the Jordanian front. A Saudi infantry battalion entered Jordan on 6 June 1967, followed by another on the 8th. Both were based in Jordan's southernmost city, Ma'an. By 17 June, the Saudi contingent in Jordan had grown to include a single infantry brigade, a tank company, two artillery batteries, a heavy mortar company, and a maintenance and support unit. By the end of July 1967, a second tank company and a third artillery battery had been added. These forces remained in Jordan until the end of 1977, when they were recalled for re-equipment and retraining in the Karak region near the Dead Sea.

The Arab air forces were reinforced by aircraft from Libya, Algeria, Morocco, Kuwait, and Saudi Arabia to make up for the massive losses suffered on the first day of the war. They were also aided by volunteer pilots from the Pakistan Air Force acting in an independent capacity. PAF pilots like Saiful Azam shot down several Israeli planes.

Weapons 
With the exception of Jordan, the Arabs relied principally on Soviet weaponry. Jordan's army was equipped with American weaponry, and its air force was composed of British aircraft.

Egypt had by far the largest and the most modern of all the Arab air forces, consisting of about 420 combat aircraft, all of them Soviet-built and with a large number of top-of-the-line MiG-21s. Of particular concern to the Israelis were the 30 Tu-16 "Badger" medium bombers, capable of inflicting heavy damage on Israeli military and civilian centres.

Israeli weapons were mainly of Western origin. Its air force was composed principally of French aircraft, while its armoured units were mostly of British and American design and manufacture. Some light infantry weapons, including the ubiquitous Uzi, were of Israeli origin.

Fighting fronts

Initial attack 

The first and most critical move of the conflict was a surprise Israeli attack on the Egyptian Air Force. Initially, both Egypt and Israel announced that they had been attacked by the other country.

On 5 June at 7:45 Israeli time, with civil defence sirens sounding all over Israel, the IAF launched Operation Focus (Moked). All but 12 of its nearly 200 operational jets launched a mass attack against Egypt's airfields. The Egyptian defensive infrastructure was extremely poor, and no airfields were yet equipped with hardened aircraft shelters capable of protecting Egypt's warplanes. Most of the Israeli warplanes headed out over the Mediterranean Sea, flying low to avoid radar detection, before turning toward Egypt. Others flew over the Red Sea.

Meanwhile, the Egyptians hindered their own defence by effectively shutting down their entire air defence system: they were worried that rebel Egyptian forces would shoot down the plane carrying Field Marshal Abdel Hakim Amer and Lt-Gen. Sidqi Mahmoud, who were en route from al Maza to Bir Tamada in the Sinai to meet the commanders of the troops stationed there. In any event, it did not make a great deal of difference as the Israeli pilots came in below Egyptian radar cover and well below the lowest point at which its SA-2 surface-to-air missile batteries could bring down an aircraft.

Although the powerful Jordanian radar facility at Ajloun detected waves of aircraft approaching Egypt and reported the code word for "war" up the Egyptian command chain, Egyptian command and communications problems prevented the warning from reaching the targeted airfields. The Israelis employed a mixed-attack strategy: bombing and strafing runs against planes parked on the ground, and bombing to disable runways with special tarmac-shredding penetration bombs developed jointly with France, leaving surviving aircraft unable to take off.

The runway at the Arish airfield was spared, as the Israelis expected to turn it into a military airport for their transports after the war. Surviving aircraft were taken out by later attack waves. The operation was more successful than expected, catching the Egyptians by surprise and destroying virtually all of the Egyptian Air Force on the ground, with few Israeli losses. Only four unarmed Egyptian training flights were in the air when the strike began. A total of 338 Egyptian aircraft were destroyed and 100 pilots were killed, although the number of aircraft lost by the Egyptians is disputed.

Among the Egyptian planes lost were all 30 Tu-16 bombers, 27 out of 40 Il-28 bombers, 12 Su-7 fighter-bombers, over 90 MiG-21s, 20 MiG-19s, 25 MiG-17 fighters, and around 32 assorted transport planes and helicopters. In addition, Egyptian radars and SAM missiles were also attacked and destroyed. The Israelis lost 19 planes, including two destroyed in air-to-air combat and 13 downed by anti-aircraft artillery. One Israeli plane, which was damaged and unable to break radio silence, was shot down by Israeli Hawk missiles after it strayed over the Negev Nuclear Research Center. Another was destroyed by an exploding Egyptian bomber.

The attack guaranteed Israeli air supremacy for the rest of the war. Attacks on other Arab air forces by Israel took place later in the day as hostilities broke out on other fronts.

The large numbers of Arab aircraft claimed destroyed by Israel on that day were at first regarded as "greatly exaggerated" by the Western press. However, the fact that the Egyptian Air Force, along with other Arab air forces attacked by Israel, made practically no appearance for the remaining days of the conflict proved that the numbers were most likely authentic. Throughout the war, Israeli aircraft continued strafing Arab airfield runways to prevent their return to usability. Meanwhile, Egyptian state-run radio had reported an Egyptian victory, falsely claiming that 70 Israeli planes had been downed on the first day of fighting.

Gaza Strip and Sinai Peninsula 

The Egyptian forces consisted of seven divisions: four armoured, two infantry, and one mechanized infantry. Overall, Egypt had around 100,000 troops and 900–950 tanks in the Sinai, backed by 1,100 APCs and 1,000 artillery pieces. This arrangement was thought to be based on the Soviet doctrine, where mobile armour units at strategic depth provide a dynamic defense while infantry units engage in defensive battles.

Israeli forces concentrated on the border with Egypt included six armoured brigades, one infantry brigade, one mechanized infantry brigade, three paratrooper brigades, giving a total of around 70,000 men and 700 tanks, who were organized in three armoured divisions. They had massed on the border the night before the war, camouflaging themselves and observing radio silence before being ordered to advance.

The Israeli plan was to surprise the Egyptian forces in both timing (the attack exactly coinciding with the IAF strike on Egyptian airfields), location (attacking via northern and central Sinai routes, as opposed to the Egyptian expectations of a repeat of the 1956 war, when the IDF attacked via the central and southern routes) and method (using a combined-force flanking approach, rather than direct tank assaults).

Northern (El Arish) Israeli division 
On 5 June, at 7:50 am, the northernmost Israeli division, consisting of three brigades and commanded by Major General Israel Tal, one of Israel's most prominent armour commanders, crossed the border at two points, opposite Nahal Oz and south of Khan Yunis. They advanced swiftly, holding fire to prolong the element of surprise. Tal's forces assaulted the "Rafah Gap", an  stretch containing the shortest of three main routes through the Sinai towards El Qantara and the Suez Canal. The Egyptians had four divisions in the area, backed by minefields, pillboxes, underground bunkers, hidden gun emplacements and trenches. The terrain on either side of the route was impassable. The Israeli plan was to hit the Egyptians at selected key points with concentrated armour.

Tal's advance was led by the 7th Armored Brigade under Colonel Shmuel Gonen. The Israeli plan called for the 7th Brigade to outflank Khan Yunis from the north and the 60th Armored Brigade under Colonel Menachem Aviram would advance from the south. The two brigades would link up and surround Khan Yunis, while the paratroopers would take Rafah. Gonen entrusted the breakthrough to a single battalion of his brigade.

Initially, the advance was met with light resistance, as Egyptian intelligence had concluded that it was a diversion for the main attack. However, as Gonen's lead battalion advanced, it suddenly came under intense fire and took heavy losses. A second battalion was brought up, but was also pinned down. Meanwhile, the 60th Brigade became bogged down in the sand, while the paratroopers had trouble navigating through the dunes. The Israelis continued to press their attack, and despite heavy losses, cleared the Egyptian positions and reached the Khan Yunis railway junction in a little over four hours.

Gonen's brigade then advanced nine miles to Rafah in twin columns. Rafah itself was circumvented, and the Israelis attacked Sheikh Zuweid,  to the southwest, which was defended by two brigades. Though inferior in numbers and equipment, the Egyptians were deeply entrenched and camouflaged. The Israelis were pinned down by fierce Egyptian resistance and called in air and artillery support to enable their lead elements to advance. Many Egyptians abandoned their positions after their commander and several of his staff were killed.

The Israelis broke through with tank-led assaults. However, Aviram's forces misjudged the Egyptians' flank and were pinned between strongholds before they were extracted after several hours. By nightfall, the Israelis had finished mopping up resistance. Israeli forces had taken significant losses, with Colonel Gonen later telling reporters that "we left many of our dead soldiers in Rafah and many burnt-out tanks." The Egyptians suffered some 2,000 casualties and lost 40 tanks.

Advance on Arish 

On 5 June, with the road open, Israeli forces continued advancing towards Arish. Already by late afternoon, elements of the 79th Armored Battalion had charged through the -long Jiradi defile, a narrow pass defended by well-emplaced troops of the Egyptian 112th Infantry Brigade. In fierce fighting, which saw the pass change hands several times, the Israelis charged through the position. The Egyptians suffered heavy casualties and tank losses, while Israeli losses stood at 66 dead, 93 wounded and 28 tanks. Emerging at the western end, Israeli forces advanced to the outskirts of Arish. As it reached the outskirts of Arish, Tal's division also consolidated its hold on Rafah and Khan Yunis.

The following day, 6 June, the Israeli forces on the outskirts of Arish were reinforced by the 7th Brigade, which fought its way through the Jiradi pass. After receiving supplies via an airdrop, the Israelis entered the city and captured the airport at 7:50 am. The Israelis entered the city at 8:00 am. Company commander Yossi Peled recounted that "Al-Arish was totally quiet, desolate. Suddenly, the city turned into a madhouse. Shots came at us from every alley, every corner, every window and house." An IDF record stated that "clearing the city was hard fighting. The Egyptians fired from the rooftops, from balconies and windows. They dropped grenades into our half-tracks and blocked the streets with trucks. Our men threw the grenades back and crushed the trucks with their tanks." Gonen sent additional units to Arish, and the city was eventually taken.

Brigadier-General Avraham Yoffe's assignment was to penetrate Sinai south of Tal's forces and north of Sharon's. Yoffe's attack allowed Tal to complete the capture of the Jiradi defile, Khan Yunis. All of them were taken after fierce fighting. Gonen subsequently dispatched a force of tanks, infantry and engineers under Colonel Yisrael Granit to continue down the Mediterranean coast towards the Suez Canal, while a second force led by Gonen himself turned south and captured Bir Lahfan and Jabal Libni.

Mid-front (Abu-Ageila) Israeli division 

Further south, on 6 June, the Israeli 38th Armored Division under Major-General Ariel Sharon assaulted Um-Katef, a heavily fortified area defended by the Egyptian 2nd Infantry Division under Major-General Sa'adi Naguib (though Naguib was actually absent) of Soviet World War II armour, which included 90 T-34-85 tanks, 22 SU-100 tank destroyers, and about 16,000 men. The Israelis had about 14,000 men and 150 post-World War II tanks including the AMX-13, Centurions, and M50 Super Shermans (modified M-4 Sherman tanks).

Two armoured brigades in the meantime, under Avraham Yoffe, slipped across the border through sandy wastes that Egypt had left undefended because they were considered impassable. Simultaneously, Sharon's tanks from the west were to engage Egyptian forces on Um-Katef ridge and block any reinforcements. Israeli infantry would clear the three trenches, while heliborne paratroopers would land behind Egyptian lines and silence their artillery. An armoured thrust would be made at al-Qusmaya to unnerve and isolate its garrison.

As Sharon's division advanced into the Sinai, Egyptian forces staged successful delaying actions at Tarat Umm, Umm Tarfa, and Hill 181. An Israeli jet was downed by anti-aircraft fire, and Sharon's forces came under heavy shelling as they advanced from the north and west. The Israeli advance, which had to cope with extensive minefields, took a large number of casualties. A column of Israeli tanks managed to penetrate the northern flank of Abu Ageila, and by dusk, all units were in position. The Israelis then brought up ninety 105 mm and 155 mm artillery cannon for a preparatory barrage, while civilian buses brought reserve infantrymen under Colonel Yekutiel Adam and helicopters arrived to ferry the paratroopers. These movements were unobserved by the Egyptians, who were preoccupied with Israeli probes against their perimeter.

As night fell, the Israeli assault troops lit flashlights, each battalion a different colour, to prevent friendly fire incidents. At 10:00 pm, Israeli artillery began a barrage on Um-Katef, firing some 6,000 shells in less than twenty minutes, the most concentrated artillery barrage in Israel's history. Israeli tanks assaulted the northernmost Egyptian defences and were largely successful, though an entire armoured brigade was stalled by mines, and had only one mine-clearance tank. Israeli infantrymen assaulted the triple line of trenches in the east. To the west, paratroopers commanded by Colonel Danny Matt landed behind Egyptian lines, though half the helicopters got lost and never found the battlefield, while others were unable to land due to mortar fire. 

Those that successfully landed on target destroyed Egyptian artillery and ammunition dumps and separated gun crews from their batteries, sowing enough confusion to significantly reduce Egyptian artillery fire. Egyptian reinforcements from Jabal Libni advanced towards Um-Katef to counterattack but failed to reach their objective, being subjected to heavy air attacks and encountering Israeli lodgements on the roads. Egyptian commanders then called in artillery attacks on their own positions. The Israelis accomplished and sometimes exceeded their overall plan, and had largely succeeded by the following day. The Egyptians suffered about 2,000 casualties, while the Israelis lost 42 dead and 140 wounded.

Yoffe's attack allowed Sharon to complete the capture of the Um-Katef, after fierce fighting. The main thrust at Um-Katef was stalled due to mines and craters. After IDF engineers had cleared a path by 4:00 pm, Israeli and Egyptian tanks engaged in fierce combat, often at ranges as close as ten yards. The battle ended in an Israeli victory, with 40 Egyptian and 19 Israeli tanks destroyed. Meanwhile, Israeli infantry finished clearing out the Egyptian trenches, with Israeli casualties standing at 14 dead and 41 wounded and Egyptian casualties at 300 dead and 100 taken prisoner.

Other Israeli forces 
Further south, on 5 June, the 8th Armored Brigade under Colonel Albert Mandler, initially positioned as a ruse to draw off Egyptian forces from the real invasion routes, attacked the fortified bunkers at Kuntilla, a strategically valuable position whose capture would enable Mandler to block reinforcements from reaching Um-Katef and to join Sharon's upcoming attack on Nakhl. The defending Egyptian battalion outnumbered and outgunned, fiercely resisted the attack, hitting a number of Israeli tanks. Most of the defenders were killed, and only three Egyptian tanks, one of them damaged, survived. By nightfall, Mandler's forces had taken Kuntilla.

With the exceptions of Rafah and Khan Yunis, Israeli forces had initially avoided entering the Gaza Strip. Israeli Defense Minister Moshe Dayan had expressly forbidden entry into the area. After Palestinian positions in Gaza opened fire on the Negev settlements of Nirim and Kissufim, IDF Chief of Staff Yitzhak Rabin overrode Dayan's instructions and ordered the 11th Mechanized Brigade under Colonel Yehuda Reshef to enter the Strip. The force was immediately met with heavy artillery fire and fierce resistance from Palestinian forces and remnants of the Egyptian forces from Rafah.

By sunset, the Israelis had taken the strategically vital Ali Muntar ridge, overlooking Gaza City, but were beaten back from the city itself. Some 70 Israelis were killed, along with Israeli journalist Ben Oyserman and American journalist Paul Schutzer. Twelve members of UNEF were also killed. On the war's second day, 6 June, the Israelis were bolstered by the 35th Paratroopers Brigade under Colonel Rafael Eitan and took Gaza City along with the entire Strip. The fighting was fierce and accounted for nearly half of all Israeli casualties on the southern front. However, Gaza rapidly fell to the Israelis.

Meanwhile, on 6 June, two Israeli reserve brigades under Yoffe, each equipped with 100 tanks, penetrated the Sinai south of Tal's division and north of Sharon's, capturing the road junctions of Abu Ageila, Bir Lahfan, and Arish, taking all of them before midnight. Two Egyptian armoured brigades counterattacked, and a fierce battle took place until the following morning. The Egyptians were beaten back by fierce resistance coupled with airstrikes, sustaining heavy tank losses. They fled west towards Jabal Libni.

The Egyptian Army 
During the ground fighting, remnants of the Egyptian Air Force attacked Israeli ground forces but took losses from the Israeli Air Force and from Israeli anti-aircraft units. Throughout the last four days, Egyptian aircraft flew 150 sorties against Israeli units in the Sinai.

Many of the Egyptian units remained intact and could have tried to prevent the Israelis from reaching the Suez Canal, or engaged in combat in the attempt to reach the canal. However, when the Egyptian Field Marshal Abdel Hakim Amer heard about the fall of Abu-Ageila, he panicked and ordered all units in the Sinai to retreat. This order effectively meant the defeat of Egypt.

Meanwhile, President Nasser, having learned of the results of the Israeli air strikes, decided together with Field Marshal Amer to order a general retreat from the Sinai within 24 hours. No detailed instructions were given concerning the manner and sequence of withdrawal.

Next fighting days 

As Egyptian columns retreated, Israeli aircraft and artillery attacked them. Israeli jets used napalm bombs during their sorties. The attacks destroyed hundreds of vehicles and caused heavy casualties. At Jabal Libni, retreating Egyptian soldiers were fired upon by their own artillery. At Bir Gafgafa, the Egyptians fiercely resisted advancing Israeli forces, knocking out three tanks and eight half-tracks, and killing 20 soldiers. Due to the Egyptians' retreat, the Israeli High Command decided not to pursue the Egyptian units but rather to bypass and destroy them in the mountainous passes of West Sinai.

Therefore, in the following two days (6 and 7 June), all three Israeli divisions (Sharon and Tal were reinforced by an armoured brigade each) rushed westwards and reached the passes. Sharon's division first went southward then westward, via An-Nakhl, to Mitla Pass with air support. It was joined there by parts of Yoffe's division, while its other units blocked the Gidi Pass. These passes became killing grounds for the Egyptians, who ran right into waiting Israeli positions and suffered heavy losses in both soldiers and vehicles. According to Egyptian diplomat Mahmoud Riad, 10,000 men were killed in one day alone, and many others died from hunger and thirst. Tal's units stopped at various points to the length of the Suez Canal.

Israel's blocking action was partially successful. Only the Gidi pass was captured before the Egyptians approached it, but at other places, Egyptian units managed to pass through and cross the canal to safety. Due to the haste of the Egyptian retreat, soldiers often abandoned weapons, military equipment, and hundreds of vehicles. Thousands of soldiers died as a result. Many Egyptian soldiers chose instead to surrender to the Israelis. However, the Israelis eventually exceeded their capabilities to provide for prisoners. As a result, they began directing soldiers towards the Suez Canal and only imprisoned high-ranking officers, who were expected to be exchanged for captured Israeli pilots.

According to some accounts, during the Egyptian retreat from the Sinai, a unit of Soviet Marines based on a Soviet warship in Port Said at the time came ashore and attempted to cross the Suez Canal eastward. The Soviet force was reportedly decimated by an Israeli air attack and lost 17 dead and 34 wounded. Among the wounded was the commander, Lt. Col. Victor Shevchenko.

During the offensive, the Israeli Navy landed six combat divers from the Shayetet 13 naval commando unit to infiltrate Alexandria harbour. The divers sank an Egyptian minesweeper before being taken prisoner. Shayetet 13 commandos also infiltrated Port Said harbour, but found no ships there. A planned commando raid against the Syrian Navy never materialized. Both Egyptian and Israeli warships made movements at sea to intimidate the other side throughout the war but did not engage each other. However, Israeli warships and aircraft did hunt for Egyptian submarines throughout the war.

On 7 June, Israel began its attack on Sharm el-Sheikh. The Israeli Navy started the operation with a probe of Egyptian naval defences. An aerial reconnaissance flight found that the area was less defended than originally thought. At about 4:30 am, three Israeli missile boats opened fire on Egyptian shore batteries, while paratroopers and commandos boarded helicopters and Nord Noratlas transport planes for an assault on Al-Tur, as Chief of Staff Rabin was convinced it was too risky to land them directly in Sharm el-Sheikh. However, the city had been largely abandoned the day before, and reports from air and naval forces finally convinced Rabin to divert the aircraft to Sharm el-Sheikh. There, the Israelis engaged in a pitched battle with the Egyptians and took the city, killing 20 Egyptian soldiers and taking eight more prisoners. At 12:15 pm, Defense Minister Dayan announced that the Straits of Tiran constituted an international waterway open to all ships without restriction.

On 8 June, Israel completed the capture of the Sinai by sending infantry units to Ras Sudar on the western coast of the peninsula.

Several tactical elements made the swift Israeli advance possible:

 The surprise attack that quickly gave the Israeli Air Force complete air superiority over the Egyptian Air Force.
 The determined implementation of an innovative battle plan.
 The lack of coordination among Egyptian troops.

These factors would prove to be decisive elements on Israel's other fronts as well.

West Bank

Egyptian control of Jordanian forces
King Hussein had given control of his army to Egypt on 1 June, on which date Egyptian General Riad arrived in Amman to take control of the Jordanian military.

Egyptian Field Marshal Amer used the confusion of the first hours of the conflict to send a cable to Amman that he was victorious; he claimed as evidence a radar sighting of a squadron of Israeli aircraft returning from bombing raids in Egypt, which he said was an Egyptian aircraft en route to attack Israel. In this cable, sent shortly before 9:00 am, Riad was ordered to attack.

Initial attack
One of the Jordanian brigades stationed in the West Bank was sent to the Hebron area in order to link with the Egyptians.

The IDF's strategic plan was to remain on the defensive along the Jordanian front, to enable focus in the expected campaign against Egypt.

Intermittent machine-gun exchanges began taking place in Jerusalem at 9:30 am, and the fighting gradually escalated as the Jordanians introduced mortar and recoilless rifle fire. Under the orders from General Narkis, the Israelis responded only with small-arms fire, firing in a flat trajectory to avoid hitting civilians, holy sites or the Old City. At 10:00 am on 5 June, the Jordanian Army began shelling Israel. Two batteries of 155 mm Long Tom cannons opened fire on the suburbs of Tel Aviv and Ramat David Airbase. The commanders of these batteries were instructed to lay a two-hour barrage against military and civilian settlements in central Israel. Some shells hit the outskirts of Tel Aviv.

By 10:30 am, Eshkol had sent a message via Odd Bull to King Hussein promising not to initiate any action against Jordan if it stayed out of the war. King Hussein replied that it was too late, "the die was cast". At 11:15 am, Jordanian howitzers began a 6,000-shell barrage at Israeli Jerusalem. The Jordanians initially targeted kibbutz Ramat Rachel in the south and Mount Scopus in the north, then ranged into the city centre and outlying neighbourhoods. Military installations, the Prime Minister's Residence, and the Knesset compound were also targeted. Jordanian forces shelled the Beit HaNassi and the Biblical Zoo, killing fifteen civilians. Israeli civilian casualties totalled 20 dead and over 1,000 wounded. Some 900 buildings were damaged, including Hadassah Ein Kerem Hospital, which had its Chagall-made windows destroyed.

At 11:50 am, sixteen Jordanian Hawker Hunters attacked Netanya, Kfar Sirkin and Kfar Saba, killing one civilian, wounding seven and destroying a transport plane. Three Iraqi Hawker Hunters strafed civilian settlements in the Jezreel Valley, and an Iraqi Tupolev Tu-16 attacked Afula, and was shot down near the Megiddo airfield. The attack caused minimal material damage, hitting only a senior citizens' home and several chicken coops, but sixteen Israeli soldiers were killed, most of them when the Tupolev crashed.

Israeli cabinet meets 
When the Israeli cabinet convened to decide what to do, Yigal Allon and Menahem Begin argued that this was an opportunity to take the Old City of Jerusalem, but Eshkol decided to defer any decision until Moshe Dayan and Yitzhak Rabin could be consulted. Uzi Narkiss made a number of proposals for military action, including the capture of Latrun, but the cabinet turned him down.
Dayan rejected multiple requests from Narkiss for permission to mount an infantry assault towards Mount Scopus. However, Dayan sanctioned a number of more limited retaliatory actions.

Initial response 
Shortly before 12:30 pm, the Israeli Air Force attacked Jordan's two airbases. The Hawker Hunters were refuelling at the time of the attack. The Israeli aircraft attacked in two waves, the first of which cratered the runways and knocked out the control towers, and the second wave destroyed all 21 of Jordan's Hawker Hunter fighters, along with six transport aircraft and two helicopters. One Israeli jet was shot down by ground fire.

Israeli aircraft also attacked H-3, an Iraqi Air Force base in western Iraq. During the attack, 12 MiG-21s, 2 MiG-17s, 5 Hunter F6s, and 3 Il-28 bombers were destroyed or shot down. A Pakistani pilot stationed at the base, Saiful Azam, who was on loan to the Royal Jordanian Air Force as an advisor, shot down an Israeli fighter and a bomber during the raid. The Jordanian radar facility at Ajloun was destroyed in an Israeli airstrike. Israeli Fouga Magister jets attacked the Jordanian 40th Brigade with rockets as it moved south from the Damia Bridge. Dozens of tanks were knocked out, and a convoy of 26 trucks carrying ammunition was destroyed. In Jerusalem, Israel responded to Jordanian shelling with a missile strike that devastated Jordanian positions. The Israelis used the L missile, a surface-to-surface missile developed jointly with France in secret.

Jordanian battalion at Government House 

A Jordanian battalion advanced up Government House ridge and dug in at the perimeter of Government House, the headquarters of the United Nations observers, and opened fire on Ramat Rachel, the Allenby Barracks and the Jewish section of Abu Tor with mortars and recoilless rifles. UN observers fiercely protested the incursion into the neutral zone, and several manhandled a Jordanian machine gun out of Government House after the crew had set it up in a second-floor window. After the Jordanians occupied Jabel Mukaber, an advance patrol was sent out and approached Ramat Rachel, where they came under fire from four civilians, including the wife of the director, who were armed with old Czech-made weapons.

The immediate Israeli response was an offensive to retake Government House and its ridge. The Jerusalem Brigade's Reserve Battalion 161, under Lieutenant-Colonel Asher Dreizin, was given the task. Dreizin had two infantry companies and eight tanks under his command, several of which broke down or became stuck in the mud at Ramat Rachel, leaving three for the assault. The Jordanians mounted fierce resistance, knocking out two tanks.

The Israelis broke through the compound's western gate and began clearing the building with grenades, before General Odd Bull, commander of the UN observers, compelled the Israelis to hold their fire, telling them that the Jordanians had already fled. The Israelis proceeded to take the Antenna Hill, directly behind Government House, and clear out a series of bunkers to the west and south. The fighting often conducted hand-to-hand, continued for nearly four hours before the surviving Jordanians fell back to trenches held by the Hittin Brigade, which were steadily overwhelmed. By 6:30 am, the Jordanians had retreated to Bethlehem, having suffered about 100 casualties. All but ten of Dreizin's soldiers were casualties, and Dreizin himself was wounded three times.

Israeli invasion 

During the late afternoon of 5 June, the Israelis launched an offensive to encircle Jerusalem, which lasted into the following day. During the night, they were supported by intense tank, artillery and mortar fire to soften up Jordanian positions. Searchlights placed atop the Labor Federation building, then the tallest in Israeli Jerusalem, exposed and blinded the Jordanians. The Jerusalem Brigade moved south of Jerusalem, while the mechanized Harel Brigade and 55th Paratroopers Brigade under Mordechai Gur encircled it from the north.

A combined force of tanks and paratroopers crossed no-man's land near the Mandelbaum Gate. Gur's 66th paratroop battalion approached the fortified Police Academy. The Israelis used bangalore torpedoes to blast their way through barbed wire leading up to the position while exposed and under heavy fire. With the aid of two tanks borrowed from the Jerusalem Brigade, they captured the Police Academy. After receiving reinforcements, they moved up to attack Ammunition Hill.

The Jordanian defenders, who were heavily dug-in, fiercely resisted the attack. All of the Israeli officers except for two company commanders were killed, and the fighting was mostly led by individual soldiers. The fighting was conducted at close quarters in trenches and bunkers and was often hand-to-hand. The Israelis captured the position after four hours of heavy fighting. During the battle, 36 Israeli and 71 Jordanian soldiers were killed. Even after the fighting on Ammunition Hill had ended, Israeli soldiers were forced to remain in the trenches due to Jordanian sniper fire from Givat HaMivtar until the Harel Brigade overran that outpost in the afternoon.

The 66th battalion subsequently drove east, and linked up with the Israeli enclave on Mount Scopus and its Hebrew University campus. Gur's other battalions, the 71st and 28th captured the other Jordanian positions around the American Colony, despite being short on men and equipment and having come under a Jordanian mortar bombardment while waiting for the signal to advance.

At the same time, the IDF's 4th Brigade attacked the fortress at Latrun, which the Jordanians had abandoned due to heavy Israeli tank fire. The mechanized Harel Brigade attacked Har Adar, but seven tanks were knocked out by mines, forcing the infantry to mount an assault without armoured cover. The Israeli soldiers advanced under heavy fire, jumping between rocks to avoid mines and the fighting was conducted at close quarters with knives and bayonets.

The Jordanians fell back after a battle that left two Israeli and eight Jordanian soldiers dead, and Israeli forces advanced through Beit Horon towards Ramallah, taking four fortified villages along the way. By the evening, the brigade arrived in Ramallah. Meanwhile, the 163rd Infantry Battalion secured Abu Tor following a fierce battle, severing the Old City from Bethlehem and Hebron.

Meanwhile, 600 Egyptian commandos stationed in the West Bank moved to attack Israeli airfields. Led by Jordanian intelligence scouts, they crossed the border and began infiltrating through Israeli settlements towards Ramla and Hatzor. They were soon detected and sought shelter in nearby fields, which the Israelis set on fire. Some 450 commandos were killed, and the remainder escaped to Jordan.

From the American Colony, the paratroopers moved towards the Old City. Their plan was to approach it via the lightly defended Salah al-Din Street. However, they made a wrong turn onto the heavily defended Nablus Road. The Israelis ran into fierce resistance. Their tanks fired at point-blank range down the street, while the paratroopers mounted repeated charges. Despite repelling repeated Israeli charges, the Jordanians gradually gave way to Israeli firepower and momentum. The Israelis suffered some 30 casualties – half the original force – while the Jordanians lost 45 dead and 142 wounded.

Meanwhile, the Israeli 71st Battalion breached barbed wire and minefields and emerged near Wadi Joz, near the base of Mount Scopus, from where the Old City could be cut off from Jericho and East Jerusalem from Ramallah. Israeli artillery targeted the one remaining route from Jerusalem to the West Bank, and shellfire deterred the Jordanians from counterattacking from their positions at Augusta-Victoria. An Israeli detachment then captured the Rockefeller Museum after a brief skirmish.

Afterwards, the Israelis broke through to the Jerusalem-Ramallah road. At Tel al-Ful, the Harel Brigade fought a running battle with up to thirty Jordanian tanks. The Jordanians stalled the advance and destroyed a number of half-tracks, but the Israelis launched air attacks and exploited the vulnerability of the external fuel tanks mounted on the Jordanian tanks. The Jordanians lost half their tanks, and retreated towards Jericho. Joining up with the 4th Brigade, the Israelis then descended through Shuafat and the site of what is now French Hill, through Jordanian defences at Mivtar, emerging at Ammunition Hill.

With Jordanian defences in Jerusalem crumbling, elements of the Jordanian 60th Brigade and an infantry battalion were sent from Jericho to reinforce Jerusalem. Its original orders were to repel the Israelis from the Latrun corridor, but due to the worsening situation in Jerusalem, the brigade was ordered to proceed to Jerusalem's Arab suburbs and attack Mount Scopus. Parallel to the brigade were infantrymen from the Imam Ali Brigade, who were approaching Issawiya. The brigades were spotted by Israeli aircraft and decimated by rocket and cannon fire. Other Jordanian attempts to reinforce Jerusalem were beaten back, either by armoured ambushes or airstrikes.

Fearing damage to holy sites and the prospect of having to fight in built-up areas, Dayan ordered his troops not to enter the Old City. He also feared that Israel would be subjected to a fierce international backlash and the outrage of Christians worldwide if it forced its way into the Old City. Privately, he told David Ben-Gurion that he was also concerned over the prospect of Israel capturing Jerusalem's holy sites, only to be forced to give them up under the threat of international sanctions.

The West Bank 
Israel was to gain almost total control of the West Bank by the evening of 7 June, and began its military occupation of the West Bank on that day, issuing a military order, the "Proclamation Regarding Law and Administration (The West Bank Area) (No. 2)—1967", which established the military government in the West Bank and granted the commander of the area full legislative, executive, and judicial power. Jordan had realised that it had no hope of defence as early as the morning of 6 June, just a day after the conflict had begun. At Nasser's request, Egypt's Abdul Munim Riad sent a situation update at midday on 6 June:

The situation on the West Bank is rapidly deteriorating. A concentrated attack has been launched on all axes, together with heavy fire, day and night. Jordanian, Syrian and Iraqi air forces in position H3 have been virtually destroyed. Upon consultation with King Hussein I have been asked to convey to you the following choices:
 1. A political decision to cease fighting to be imposed by a third party (the USA, the Soviet Union or the Security Council).
 2. To vacate the West Bank tonight.
 3. To go on fighting for one more day, resulting in the isolation and destruction of the entire Jordanian Army.
King Hussein has asked me to refer this matter to you for an immediate reply.

An Egyptian order for Jordanian forces to withdraw across the Jordan River was issued at 10 am on 6 June; however that afternoon King Hussein learned of the impending United Nations Security Council Resolution 233 and decided instead to hold out in the hope that a ceasefire would be implemented soon. It was already too late, as the counter-order caused confusion and in many cases, it was not possible to regain positions that had previously been left.

On 7 June, Dayan ordered his troops not to enter the Old City but, upon hearing that the UN was about to declare a ceasefire, he changed his mind, and without cabinet clearance, decided to capture it. Two paratroop battalions attacked Augusta-Victoria Hill, high ground overlooking the Old City from the east. One battalion attacked from Mount Scopus, and another attacked from the valley between it and the Old City. Another paratroop battalion, personally led by Gur, broke into the Old City and was joined by the other two battalions after their missions were complete. The paratroopers met little resistance. The fighting was conducted solely by the paratroopers; the Israelis did not use armour during the battle out of fear of severe damage to the Old City.

In the north, a battalion from Peled's division checked Jordanian defences in the Jordan Valley. A brigade from Peled's division captured the western part of the West Bank. One brigade attacked Jordanian artillery positions around Jenin, which were shelling Ramat David Airbase. The Jordanian 12th Armored Battalion, which outnumbered the Israelis, held off repeated attempts to capture Jenin. However, Israeli air attacks took their toll, and the Jordanian M48 Pattons, with their external fuel tanks, proved vulnerable at short distances, even to the Israeli-modified Shermans. Twelve Jordanian tanks were destroyed, and only six remained operational.

Just after dusk, Israeli reinforcements arrived. The Jordanians continued to fiercely resist, and the Israelis were unable to advance without artillery and air support. One Israeli jet attacked the Jordanian commander's tank, wounding him and killing his radio operator and intelligence officer. The surviving Jordanian forces then withdrew to Jenin, where they were reinforced by the 25th Infantry Brigade. The Jordanians were effectively surrounded in Jenin.

Jordanian infantry and their three remaining tanks managed to hold off the Israelis until 4:00 am, when three battalions arrived to reinforce them in the afternoon. The Jordanian tanks charged and knocked out multiple Israeli vehicles, and the tide began to shift. After sunrise, Israeli jets and artillery conducted a two-hour bombardment against the Jordanians. The Jordanians lost 10 dead and 250 wounded, and had only seven tanks left, including two without gas, and sixteen APCs. The Israelis then fought their way into Jenin and captured the city after fierce fighting.

After the Old City fell, the Jerusalem Brigade reinforced the paratroopers, and continued to the south, capturing Judea and Gush Etzion. Hebron was taken without any resistance. Fearful that Israeli soldiers would exact retribution for the 1929 massacre of the city's Jewish community, Hebron's residents flew white sheets from their windows and rooftops and gave up their weapons.  The Harel Brigade proceeded eastward, descending to the Jordan River.

On 7 June, Israeli forces seized Bethlehem, taking the city after a brief battle that left some 40 Jordanian soldiers dead, with the remainder fleeing. On the same day, one of Peled's brigades seized Nablus; then it joined one of Central Command's armoured brigades to fight the Jordanian forces; as the Jordanians held the advantage of superior equipment and were equal in numbers to the Israelis.

Again, the air superiority of the IAF proved paramount as it immobilized the Jordanians, leading to their defeat. One of Peled's brigades joined with its Central Command counterparts coming from Ramallah, and the remaining two blocked the Jordan river crossings together with the Central Command's 10th. Engineering Corps sappers blew up the Abdullah and Hussein bridges with captured Jordanian mortar shells, while elements of the Harel Brigade crossed the river and occupied positions along the east bank to cover them, but quickly pulled back due to American pressure. The Jordanians, anticipating an Israeli offensive deep into Jordan, assembled the remnants of their army and Iraqi units in Jordan to protect the western approaches to Amman and the southern slopes of the Golan Heights.

As Israel continued its offensive on 7 June, taking no account of the UN ceasefire resolution, the Egyptian-Jordanian command ordered a full Jordanian withdrawal for the second time, in order to avoid an annihilation of the Jordanian army. This was complete by nightfall on 7 June.

After the Old City was captured, Dayan told his troops to "dig in" to hold it. When an armoured brigade commander entered the West Bank on his own initiative, and stated that he could see Jericho, Dayan ordered him back. It was only after intelligence reports indicated that Hussein had withdrawn his forces across the Jordan River that Dayan ordered his troops to capture the West Bank. According to Narkis:

First, the Israeli government had no intention of capturing the West Bank. On the contrary, it was opposed to it. Second, there was not any provocation on the part of the IDF. Third, the rein was only loosened when a real threat to Jerusalem's security emerged. This is truly how things happened on June 5, although it is difficult to believe. The end result was something that no one had planned.

Golan Heights 

In May–June 1967, in preparation for conflict, the Israeli government planned to confine the confrontation to the Egyptian front, whilst taking into account the possibility of some fighting on the Syrian front.

Syrian front 5–8 June 
Syria largely stayed out of the conflict for the first four days.

False Egyptian reports of a crushing victory against the Israeli army and forecasts that Egyptian forces would soon be attacking Tel Aviv influenced Syria's decision to enter the war – in a sporadic manner – during this period. Syrian artillery began shelling northern Israel, and twelve Syrian jets attacked Israeli settlements in the Galilee. Israeli fighter jets intercepted the Syrian aircraft, shooting down three and driving off the rest. In addition, two Lebanese Hawker Hunter jets, two of the twelve Lebanon had, crossed into Israeli airspace and began strafing Israeli positions in the Galilee. They were intercepted by Israeli fighter jets, and one was shot down.

On the evening of 5 June, the Israeli Air Force attacked Syrian airfields. The Syrian Air Force lost some 32 MiG 21s, 23 MiG-15 and MiG-17 fighters, and two Ilyushin Il-28 bombers, two-thirds of its fighting strength. The Syrian aircraft that survived the attack retreated to distant bases and played no further role in the war. Following the attack, Syria realised that the news it had received from Egypt of the near-total destruction of the Israeli military could not have been true.

On 6 June, a minor Syrian force tried to capture the water plants at Tel Dan (the subject of a fierce escalation two years earlier), Dan, and She'ar Yashuv. These attacks were repulsed with the loss of twenty soldiers and seven tanks. An Israeli officer was also killed. But a broader Syrian offensive quickly failed. Syrian reserve units were broken up by Israeli air attacks, and several tanks were reported to have sunk in the Jordan River.

Other problems included tanks being too wide for bridges, lack of radio communications between tanks and infantry, and units ignoring orders to advance. A post-war Syrian army report concluded:

Our forces did not go on the offensive either because they did not arrive or were not wholly prepared or because they could not find shelter from the enemy's aircraft. The reserves could not withstand the air attacks; they dispersed after their morale plummeted.

The Syrians bombarded Israeli civilian settlements in the Galilee Panhandle with two battalions of M-46 130mm guns, four companies of heavy mortars, and dug-in Panzer IV tanks. The Syrian bombardment killed two civilians and hit 205 houses as well as farming installations. An inaccurate report from a Syrian officer, however, said that as a result of the bombardment that "the enemy appears to have suffered heavy losses and is retreating".

Israelis debate whether the Golan Heights should be attacked 
On 7 and 8 June, the Israeli leadership debated about whether to attack the Golan Heights as well. Syria had supported pre-war raids that had helped raise tensions and had routinely shelled Israel from the Heights, so some Israeli leaders wanted to see Syria punished. Military opinion was that the attack would be extremely costly since it would entail an uphill battle against a strongly fortified enemy. The western side of the Golan Heights consists of a rock escarpment that rises 500 meters (1,700 ft) from the Sea of Galilee and the Jordan River, and then flattens to a gently sloping plateau. Dayan opposed the operation bitterly at first, believing such an undertaking would result in losses of 30,000 and might trigger Soviet intervention. Prime Minister Eshkol, on the other hand, was more open to the possibility, as was the head of the Northern Command, David Elazar, whose unbridled enthusiasm for and confidence in the operation may have eroded Dayan's reluctance.

Eventually, the situation on the Southern and Central fronts cleared up, intelligence estimated that the likelihood of Soviet intervention had been reduced, reconnaissance showed some Syrian defences in the Golan region collapsing, and an intercepted cable revealed that Nasser was urging the President of Syria to immediately accept a cease-fire. At 3 am on 9 June, Syria announced its acceptance of the cease-fire. Despite this announcement, Dayan became more enthusiastic about the idea and four hours later at 7 am, "gave the order to go into action against Syria" without consultation or government authorisation.

The Syrian army consisted of about 75,000 men grouped in nine brigades, supported by an adequate amount of artillery and armour. Israeli forces used in combat consisted of two brigades (the 8th Armored Brigade and the Golani Brigade) in the northern part of the front at Givat HaEm, and another two (infantry and one of Peled's brigades summoned from Jenin) in the centre. The Golan Heights' unique terrain (mountainous slopes crossed by parallel streams every several kilometres running east to west), and the general lack of roads in the area channelled both forces along east–west axes of movement and restricted the ability of units to support those on either flank. Thus the Syrians could move north–south on the plateau itself, and the Israelis could move north–south at the base of the Golan escarpment. An advantage Israel possessed was the excellent intelligence collected by Mossad operative Eli Cohen (who was captured and executed in Syria in 1965) regarding the Syrian battle positions. Syria had built extensive defensive fortifications in depths up to 15 kilometers.

As opposed to all the other campaigns, IAF was only partially effective in the Golan because the fixed fortifications were so effective. However, the Syrian forces proved unable to put up effective defence largely because the officers were poor leaders and treated their soldiers badly; often officers would retreat from danger, leaving their men confused and ineffective. The Israelis also had the upper hand during close combat that took place in the numerous Syrian bunkers along the Golan Heights, as they were armed with the Uzi, a submachine gun designed for close combat, while Syrian soldiers were armed with the heavier AK-47 assault rifle, designed for combat in more open areas.

Israeli attack: first day (9 June)

On the morning of 9 June, Israeli jets began carrying out dozens of sorties against Syrian positions from Mount Hermon to Tawfiq, using rockets salvaged from captured Egyptian stocks. The airstrikes knocked out artillery batteries and storehouses and forced transport columns off the roads. The Syrians suffered heavy casualties and a drop in morale, with a number of senior officers and troops deserting. The attacks also provided time as Israeli forces cleared paths through Syrian minefields. However, the airstrikes did not seriously damage the Syrians' bunkers and trench systems, and the bulk of Syrian forces on the Golan remained in their positions.

About two hours after the airstrikes began, the 8th Armored Brigade, led by Colonel Albert Mandler, advanced into the Golan Heights from Givat HaEm. Its advance was spearheaded by Engineering Corps sappers and eight bulldozers, which cleared away barbed wire and mines. As they advanced, the force came under fire, and five bulldozers were immediately hit. The Israeli tanks, with their manoeuvrability sharply reduced by the terrain, advanced slowly under fire toward the fortified village of Sir al-Dib, with their ultimate objective being the fortress at Qala. Israeli casualties steadily mounted. 

Part of the attacking force lost its way and emerged opposite Za'ura, a redoubt manned by Syrian reservists. With the situation critical, Colonel Mandler ordered simultaneous assaults on Za'ura and Qala. Heavy and confused fighting followed, with Israeli and Syrian tanks struggling around obstacles and firing at extremely short ranges. Mandler recalled that "the Syrians fought well and bloodied us. We beat them only by crushing them under our treads and by blasting them with our cannons at very short range, from 100 to 500 meters." The first three Israeli tanks to enter Qala were stopped by a Syrian bazooka team, and a relief column of seven Syrian tanks arrived to repel the attackers.

The Israelis took heavy fire from the houses, but could not turn back, as other forces were advancing behind them, and they were on a narrow path with mines on either side. The Israelis continued pressing forward and called for air support. A pair of Israeli jets destroyed two of the Syrian tanks, and the remainder withdrew. The surviving defenders of Qala retreated after their commander was killed. Meanwhile, Za'ura fell in an Israeli assault, and the Israelis also captured the 'Ein Fit fortress.

In the central sector, the Israeli 181st Battalion captured the strongholds of Dardara and Tel Hillal after fierce fighting. Desperate fighting also broke out along the operation's northern axis, where Golani Brigade attacked thirteen Syrian positions, including the formidable Tel Fakhr position. Navigational errors placed the Israelis directly under the Syrians' guns. In the fighting that followed, both sides took heavy casualties, with the Israelis losing all nineteen of their tanks and half-tracks. The Israeli battalion commander then ordered his twenty-five remaining men to dismount, divide into two groups, and charge the northern and southern flanks of Tel Fakhr. The first Israelis to reach the perimeter of the southern approach laid on the barbed wire, allowing their comrades to vault over them. From there, they assaulted the fortified Syrian positions. The fighting was waged at extremely close quarters, often hand-to-hand.

On the northern flank, the Israelis broke through within minutes and cleared out the trenches and bunkers. During the seven-hour battle, the Israelis lost 31 dead and 82 wounded, while the Syrians lost 62 dead and 20 captured. Among the dead was the Israeli battalion commander. The Golani Brigade's 51st Battalion took Tel 'Azzaziat, and Darbashiya also fell to Israeli forces.

By the evening of 9 June, the four Israeli brigades had all broken through to the plateau, where they could be reinforced and replaced. Thousands of reinforcements began reaching the front, those tanks and half-tracks that had survived the previous day's fighting were refuelled and replenished with ammunition, and the wounded were evacuated. By dawn, the Israelis had eight brigades in the sector.

Syria's first line of defence had been shattered, but the defences beyond that remained largely intact. Mount Hermon and the Banias in the north, and the entire sector between Tawfiq and Customs House Road in the south remained in Syrian hands. In a meeting early on the night of 9 June, Syrian leaders decided to reinforce those positions as quickly as possible and to maintain a steady barrage on Israeli civilian settlements.

Israeli attack: the next day (10 June)
Throughout the night, the Israelis continued their advance, though it was slowed by fierce resistance. An anticipated Syrian counterattack never materialized. At the fortified village of Jalabina, a garrison of Syrian reservists, levelling their anti-aircraft guns, held off the Israeli 65th Paratroop Battalion for four hours before a small detachment managed to penetrate the village and knock out the heavy guns.

Meanwhile, the 8th Brigade's tanks moved south from Qala, advancing six miles to Wasit under heavy artillery and tank bombardment. At the Banias in the north, Syrian mortar batteries opened fire on advancing Israeli forces only after Golani Brigade sappers cleared a path through a minefield, killing sixteen Israeli soldiers and wounding four.

On the next day, 10 June, the central and northern groups joined in a pincer movement on the plateau, but that fell mainly on empty territory as the Syrian forces retreated. At 8:30 am, the Syrians began blowing up their own bunkers, burning documents and retreating. Several units joined by Elad Peled's troops climbed to the Golan from the south, only to find the positions mostly empty. When the 8th Brigade reached Mansura, five miles from Wasit, the Israelis met no opposition and found abandoned equipment, including tanks, in perfect working condition. In the fortified Banias village, Golani Brigade troops found only several Syrian soldiers chained to their positions.

During the day, the Israeli units stopped after obtaining manoeuvre room between their positions and a line of volcanic hills to the west. In some locations, Israeli troops advanced after an agreed-upon cease-fire to occupy strategically strong positions. To the east, the ground terrain is an open gently sloping plain. This position later became the cease-fire line known as the "Purple Line".

Time magazine reported: "In an effort to pressure the United Nations into enforcing a ceasefire, Damascus Radio undercut its own army by broadcasting the fall of the city of Quneitra three hours before it actually capitulated. That premature report of the surrender of their headquarters destroyed the morale of the Syrian troops left in the Golan area."

Conclusion 

By 10 June, Israel had completed its final offensive in the Golan Heights, and a ceasefire was signed the day after. Israel had seized the Gaza Strip, the Sinai Peninsula, the West Bank of the Jordan River (including East Jerusalem), and the Golan Heights. About one million Arabs were placed under Israel's direct control in the newly captured territories. Israel's strategic depth grew to at least 300 kilometres in the south, 60 kilometres in the east, and 20 kilometres of extremely rugged terrain in the north, a security asset that would prove useful in the Yom Kippur War six years later.

Speaking three weeks after the war ended, as he accepted an honorary degree from Hebrew University, Yitzhak Rabin gave his reasoning behind the success of Israel:

Our airmen, who struck the enemies' planes so accurately that no one in the world understands how it was done and people seek technological explanations or secret weapons; our armoured troops who beat the enemy even when their equipment was inferior to his; our soldiers in all other branches ... who overcame our enemies everywhere, despite the latter's superior numbers and fortifications—all these revealed not only coolness and courage in the battle but ... an understanding that only their personal stand against the greatest dangers would achieve victory for their country and for their families, and that if victory was not theirs the alternative was annihilation.

In recognition of contributions, Rabin was given the honour of naming the war for the Israelis. From the suggestions proposed, including the "War of Daring", "War of Salvation", and "War of the Sons of Light", he "chose the least ostentatious, the Six-Day War, evoking the days of creation".

Dayan's final report on the war to the Israeli general staff listed several shortcomings in Israel's actions, including misinterpretation of Nasser's intentions, overdependence on the United States, and reluctance to act when Egypt closed the Straits. He also credited several factors for Israel's success: Egypt did not appreciate the advantage of striking first and their adversaries did not accurately gauge Israel's strength and its willingness to use it.

In Egypt, according to Heikal, Nasser had admitted his responsibility for the military defeat in June 1967. According to historian Abd al-Azim Ramadan, Nasser's mistaken decisions to expel the international peacekeeping force from the Sinai Peninsula and close the Straits of Tiran in 1967 led to a state of war with Israel, despite Egypt's lack of military preparedness.

After the 1973 Yom Kippur War, Egypt reviewed the causes of its loss of the 1967 war. Issues that were identified included "the individualistic bureaucratic leadership"; "promotions on the basis of loyalty, not expertise, and the army's fear of telling Nasser the truth"; lack of intelligence; and better Israeli weapons, command, organization, and will to fight.

Casualties 

Between 776 and 983 Israelis were killed and 4,517 were wounded. Fifteen Israeli soldiers were captured. Arab casualties were far greater. Between 9,800 and 15,000 Egyptian soldiers were listed as killed or missing in action. An additional 4,338 Egyptian soldiers were captured. Jordanian losses are estimated to be 700 killed in action with another 2,500 wounded. The Syrians were estimated to have sustained between 1,000 and 2,500 killed in action. Between 367 and 591 Syrians were captured.

Casualties were also suffered by UNEF, the United Nations Emergency Force that was stationed on the Egyptian side of the border. In three different episodes, Israeli forces attacked a UNEF convoy, camps in which UNEF personnel were concentrated and the UNEF headquarters in Gaza, resulting in one Brazilian peacekeeper and 14 Indian officials killed by Israeli forces, with an additional seventeen peacekeepers wounded in both contingents.

Controversies

Preemptive strike v. unjustified attack 

At the commencement of hostilities, both Egypt and Israel announced that they had been attacked by the other country. The Israeli government later abandoned its initial position, acknowledging Israel had struck first, claiming that it was a preemptive strike in the face of a planned invasion by Egypt. On the other hand, the Arab view was that it was unjustified to attack Egypt. Many commentators consider the war as the classic case of anticipatory attack in self-defense.

Allegations of atrocities committed against Egyptian soldiers 
It has been alleged that Nasser did not want Egypt to learn of the true extent of his defeat and so ordered the killing of Egyptian army stragglers making their way back to the Suez canal zone. There have also been allegations from both Israeli and Egyptian sources that Israeli troops killed unarmed Egyptian prisoners.

Allegations of military support from the US, UK and Soviet Union 
There have been a number of allegations of direct military support of Israel during the war by the US and the UK, including the supply of equipment (despite an embargo) and the participation of US forces in the conflict. Many of these allegations and conspiracy theories have been disputed and it has been claimed that some were given currency in the Arab world to explain the Arab defeat.
It has also been claimed that the Soviet Union, in support of its Arab allies, used its naval strength in the Mediterranean to act as a major restraint on the US Navy.

America features prominently in Arab conspiracy theories purporting to explain the June 1967 defeat. Mohamed Hassanein Heikal, a confidant of Nasser, claims that President Lyndon B. Johnson was obsessed with Nasser and that Johnson conspired with Israel to bring him down. The reported Israeli troop movements seemed all the more threatening because they were perceived in the context of a US conspiracy against Egypt. Salah Bassiouny of the Foreign Ministry, claims that Foreign Ministry saw the reported Israeli troop movements as credible because Israel had reached the level at which it could find strategic alliance with the United States. 

During the war, Cairo announced that American and British planes were participating in the Israeli attack. Nasser broke off diplomatic relations following this allegation. Nasser's image of the United States was such that he might well have believed the worst. However Anwar Sadat implied that Nasser used this deliberate conspiracy in order to accuse the United States as a political cover-up for domestic consumption. Lutfi Abd al-Qadir, the director of Radio Cairo during the late 1960s, who accompanied Nasser to his visits in Moscow, had his conspiracy theory that both the Soviets and the Western powers wanted to topple Nasser or to reduce his influence.

USS Liberty incident 

Israel said the attack was a case of mistaken identity, and that the ship had been misidentified as the Egyptian vessel El Quseir. Israel apologized for the mistake and paid compensation to the victims or their families, and to the United States for damage to the ship. After an investigation, the U.S. accepted the explanation that the incident was friendly fire and the issue was closed by the exchange of diplomatic notes in 1987. Others however, including the then United States Secretary of State Dean Rusk, Chief of Naval Operations at the time, Admiral Thomas Moorer, some survivors of the attack and intelligence officials familiar with transcripts of intercepted signals on the day, have rejected these conclusions as unsatisfactory and maintain that the attack was made in the knowledge that the ship was American.

Aftermath 
The political importance of the 1967 War was immense. Israel demonstrated again that it was able and willing to initiate strategic strikes that could change the regional balance. Egypt and Syria learned tactical lessons and would launch an attack in 1973 in an attempt to reclaim their lost territories.

After following other Arab nations in declaring war, Mauritania remained in a declared state of war with Israel until about 1999. The United States imposed an embargo on new arms agreements to all Middle East countries, including Israel. The embargo remained in force until the end of the year, despite urgent Israeli requests to lift it.

Israel and Zionism 
Following the war, Israel experienced a wave of national euphoria, and the press praised the military's performance for weeks afterwards. New "victory coins" were minted to celebrate. In addition, the world's interest in Israel grew, and the country's economy, which had been in crisis before the war, flourished due to an influx of tourists and donations, as well as the extraction of oil from the Sinai's wells. The aftermath of the war also saw a baby boom, which lasted for four years.

The aftermath of the war is also of religious significance. Under Jordanian rule, Jews were expelled from Jerusalem and were effectively barred from visiting the Western Wall, despite Article VIII of the 1949 Armistice Agreement demanded Israeli Jewish access to the Western Wall. Jewish holy sites were not maintained, and Jewish cemeteries had been desecrated. After the annexation to Israel, each religious group was granted administration over its holy sites. For the first time since 1948, Jews could visit the Old City of Jerusalem and pray at the Western Wall, the holiest site where Jews are permitted to pray, an event celebrated every year during Yom Yerushalayim. 

Despite the Temple Mount (known to Muslims as the Al-Aqsa Mosque) being the most important holy site in Jewish tradition, it has been under sole administration of the Jordanian Muslim Waqf, and Jews are barred from praying on the Temple Mount, although they are allowed to visit it. In Hebron, Jews gained access to the Cave of the Patriarchs – the second-most holy site in Judaism, after the Temple Mount – for the first time since the 14th century (previously Jews were allowed to pray only at the entrance). Other Jewish holy sites, such as Rachel's Tomb in Bethlehem and Joseph's Tomb in Nablus, also became accessible.

The war inspired the Jewish diaspora, which was swept up in overwhelming support for Israel. According to Michael Oren, the war enabled American Jews to "walk with their backs straight and flex their political muscle as never before. American Jewish organizations which had previously kept Israel at arms length suddenly proclaimed their Zionism." Thousands of Jewish immigrants arrived from Western countries such as the United States, United Kingdom, Canada, France and South Africa after the war. Many of them returned to their countries of origin after a few years; one survey found that 58% of American Jews who immigrated to Israel between 1961 and 1972 returned to the United States. Nevertheless, immigration to Israel of Jews from Western countries, which was previously only a trickle, was a significant force for the first time. 

Most notably, the war stirred Zionist passions among Jews in the Soviet Union, who had by that time been forcibly assimilated. Many Soviet Jews subsequently applied for exit visas and began protesting for their right to immigrate to Israel. Following diplomatic pressure from the West, the Soviet government began granting exit visas to Jews in growing numbers. From 1970 to 1988, some 291,000 Soviet Jews were granted exit visas, of whom 165,000 immigrated to Israel and 126,000 immigrated to the United States. The great rise in Jewish pride in the wake of Israel's victory also fueled the beginnings of the baal teshuva movement. The war gave impetus to a Chabad campaign in which the Lubavitcher Rebbe directed his followers to put tefillin on Jewish men around the world.

Jews in Arab countries 

In the Arab nations, populations of minority Jews faced persecution and expulsion following the Israeli victory, contributing to the Jewish exodus from Arab lands, which had been ongoing since 1948. As a result, Jewish populations in Arab countries further diminished as many Jews emigrated to Israel and other Western countries. According to historian and ambassador Michael Oren:

Mobs attacked Jewish neighbourhoods in Egypt, Yemen, Lebanon, Tunisia, and Morocco, burning synagogues and assaulting residents. A pogrom in Tripoli, Libya, left 18 Jews dead and 25 injured; the survivors were herded into detention centres. Of Egypt's 4,000 Jews, 800 were arrested, including the chief rabbis of both Cairo and Alexandria, and their property sequestered by the government. The ancient communities of Damascus and Baghdad were placed under house arrest, their leaders imprisoned and fined. A total of 7,000 Jews were expelled, many with merely a satchel.

Antisemitism in Communist countries 
Following the war, a series of antisemitic purges began in Communist countries. Some 11,200 Jews from Poland immigrated to Israel during the 1968 Polish political crisis and the following year.

War of Attrition 
Following the war, Egypt initiated clashes along the Suez Canal in what became known as the War of Attrition.

Palestinian terrorism 
As a result of Israel's defeat of Arab armies, the Palestinian leadership concluded that the Arab world was not able to militarily defeat Israel in open warfare, which in turn led to an increase in terrorist attacks with an international reach. While the Palestine Liberation Organization (PLO) was established in 1964, it became militarily active after the Six-Day War; its actions gave credibility to those who claimed that only terror could end Israel's existence. Also after the war, the Popular Front for the Liberation of Palestine emerged, with its leader George Habash speaking of turning the occupied territories into an "inferno whose fires consume the usurpers". These events led to a series of hijackings, bombings, and kidnappings that culminated in the massacre of Israeli athletes during the 1972 Munich Olympics.

Peace and diplomacy 
Following the war, Israel made an offer for peace that included the return of most of the recently captured territories. According to Chaim Herzog:

The 19 June Israeli cabinet decision did not include the Gaza Strip and left open the possibility of Israel permanently acquiring parts of the West Bank. On 25–27 June, Israel incorporated East Jerusalem together with areas of the West Bank to the north and south into Jerusalem's new municipal boundaries.

The Israeli decision was to be conveyed to the Arab nations by the United States. The U.S. was informed of the decision, but not that it was to transmit it. There is no evidence of receipt from Egypt or Syria, and some historians claim that they may never have received the offer.

In September, the Khartoum Arab Summit resolved that there would be "no peace, no recognition and no negotiation with Israel". However, as Avraham Sela notes, the Khartoum conference effectively marked a shift in the perception of the conflict by the Arab states away from one centred on the question of Israel's legitimacy, toward one focusing on territories and boundaries. This was shown on 22 November when Egypt and Jordan accepted United Nations Security Council Resolution 242. Nasser forestalled any movement toward direct negotiations with Israel. In dozens of speeches and statements, Nasser posited the equation that any direct peace talks with Israel were tantamount to surrender.

After the war, the entire Soviet bloc of Eastern Europe (with the exception of Romania) broke off diplomatic relations with Israel.

The 1967 War laid the foundation for future discord in the region, as the Arab states resented Israel's victory and did not want to give up territory.

On 22 November 1967, the United Nations Security Council adopted Resolution 242, the "land for peace" formula, which called for Israeli withdrawal "from territories occupied" in 1967 and "the termination of all claims or states of belligerency". Resolution 242 recognized the right of "every state in the area to live in peace within secure and recognized boundaries free from threats or acts of force." Israel returned the Sinai to Egypt in 1978, after the Camp David Accords. In the summer of 2005, Israel withdrew all military forces and evacuated all civilians from the Gaza Strip. Its army frequently re-enters Gaza for military operations and still retains control of the seaports, airports and most of the border crossings.

Occupied territories and Arab displaced populations 

There was extensive displacement of populations in the occupied territories: of about one million Palestinians in the West Bank and Gaza, 280,000 to 325,000 were displaced from their homes. Most of them settled in Jordan, where they contributed to the growing unrest. The other 700,000 remained. In the Golan Heights, over 100,000 fled. Israel allowed only the inhabitants of East Jerusalem and the Golan Heights to receive full Israeli citizenship, applying its law, administration and jurisdiction to these territories in 1967 and 1981, respectively. The vast majority of the populations in both territories declined to take citizenship. See also Israeli–Palestinian conflict and Golan Heights.

In his book Righteous Victims (1999), Israeli "New Historian" Benny Morris writes:

In addition, between 80,000 and 110,000 Syrians fled the Golan Heights, of which about 20,000 were from the city of Quneitra. According to more recent research by the Israeli daily Haaretz, a total of 130,000 Syrian inhabitants fled or were expelled from the territory, most of them pushed out by the Israeli army.

Long term 

Israel made peace with Egypt following the Camp David Accords of 1978 and completed a staged withdrawal from the Sinai in 1982. However, the position of the other occupied territories has been a long-standing and bitter cause of conflict for decades between Israel and the Palestinians, and the Arab world in general. Jordan and Egypt eventually withdrew their claims to sovereignty over the West Bank and Gaza, respectively. Israel and Jordan signed a peace treaty in 1994.

After the Israeli occupation of these territories, the Gush Emunim movement launched a large settlement effort in these areas to secure a permanent foothold. There are now hundreds of thousands of Israeli settlers in the West Bank. They are a matter of controversy within Israel, both among the general population and within different political administrations, supporting them to varying degrees. Palestinians consider them a provocation. The Israeli settlements in Gaza were evacuated in August 2005 as a part of Israel's disengagement from Gaza.

See also 
 Hafez al-Assad, Syrian Defense Minister
 Leonid Brezhnev, Soviet leader
 Catch 67, a 2017 Israeli philosophy book on the West Bank occupation that launched a public dialogue on the war's 50th anniversary
 Abba Eban, Israeli Foreign Minister
 Israeli MIAs
 List of modern conflicts in the Middle East
 Robert McNamara, U.S. Defense Secretary
 Syrian towns and villages depopulated in the Arab–Israeli conflict
 U Thant, Secretary General of the United Nations
 1970s commodities boom

References and notes

Explanatory notes 
 It was twenty minutes after the capture of the Western Wall that David Rubinger shot his "signature" photograph of three Israeli paratroopers gazing in wonder up at the wall. As part of the terms for his access to the front lines, Rubinger handed the negatives to the Israeli government, who then distributed this image widely. Although he was displeased with the violation of his copyright, the widespread use of his photo made it famous, and it is now considered a defining image of the conflict and one of the best-known in the history of Israel.
 
 Gideon Rafael [Israeli Ambassador to the UN] received a message from the Israeli foreign office: "Inform immediately the President of the Sec. Co. that Israel is now engaged in repelling Egyptian land and air forces." At 3:10 am, Rafael woke ambassador Hans Tabor, the Danish President of the Security Council for June, with the news that Egyptian forces had "moved against Israel".
 [At Security Council meeting of 5 June], both Israel and Egypt claimed to be repelling an invasion by the other.
 "Egyptian sources claimed that Israel had initiated hostilities [...] but Israeli officials – Eban and Evron – swore that Egypt had fired first".
 "Gideon Rafael phoned Danish ambassador Hans Tabor, Security Council president for the month of June, and informed him that Israel was responding to a 'cowardly and treacherous' attack from Egypt...".

Citations

General and cited sources 

 
 
 
 
 
 
 
 
 
 
 
 
 
 
  Available in multiple PDF files from the Combat Studies Institute and the Combined Arms Research Library, CSI Publications in parts .
 
 
 
 
 
 
 
 
 
 
 
 
 
 
 
 
 
 
 
 
 
 
 
   
 
 
 
  
 
 
 
  Google Books

Further reading 

 al-Qusi, Abdallah Ahmad Hamid. (1999). Al-Wisam fi at-Ta'rikh. Cairo: Al-Mu'asasa al-'Arabiya al-Haditha. No ISBN available.
 Aloni, Shlomo (2001). Arab–Israeli Air Wars 1947–1982. Osprey Aviation. 
 Alteras, Isaac. (1993). Eisenhower and Israel: U.S.–Israeli Relations, 1953–1960, University Press of Florida. .
 
 Barzilai, Gad (1996). Wars, Internal Conflicts, and Political Order: A Jewish Democracy in the Middle East. New York University Press. 
 Ben-Gurion, David. (1999). Ben-Gurion diary: May–June 1967. Israel Studies 4(2), 199–220.
 Black, Ian (1992). Israel's Secret Wars: A History of Israel's Intelligence Services. Grove Press. 
 Bober, Arie (ed.) (1972). The other Israel. Doubleday Anchor. .
 Boczek, Boleslaw Adam (2005). International Law: A Dictionary. Scarecrow Press. 
 Borowiec, Andrew. (1998). Modern Tunisia: A Democratic Apprenticeship. Greenwood Publishing Group. .
 Brecher, Michael. (1996). Eban and Israeli foreign policy: Diplomacy, war and disengagement. In A Restless Mind: Essays in Honor of Amos Perlmutter, Benjamin Frankel (ed.), pp. 104–117. Routledge. 
 Bregman, Ahron (2000). Israel's Wars, 1947–1993. Routledge. .
 Bregman, Ahron (2002). Israel's Wars: A History Since 1947. London: Routledge. 
 Christie, Hazel (1999). Law of the Sea. Manchester: Manchester University Press. 
 Colaresi, Michael P. (2005). Scare Tactics: The politics of international rivalry. Syracuse University Press. 
 Cristol, A Jay (2002). Liberty Incident: The 1967 Israeli Attack on the U.S. Navy Spy Ship. Brassey's. 
 Eban, Abba (1977). Abba Eban: An Autobiography. Random House. 
 El-Gamasy, Mohamed Abdel Ghani. (1993). The October War. The American University in Cairo Press. .
 
 
 Finkelstein, Norman (June 2017). Analysis of the war and its aftermath, on the 50th anniversary of the June 1967 war  (3 parts, each about 30 min)
 Gelpi, Christopher (2002). Power of Legitimacy: Assessing the Role of Norms in Crisis Bargaining. Princeton University Press. 
 Gerner, Deborah J. (1994). One Land, Two Peoples. Westview Press. , p. 112
 Gerteiny, Alfred G. & Ziegler, Jean (2007). The Terrorist Conjunction: The United States, the Israeli-Palestinian Conflict, and Al-Qā'ida. Greenwood Publishing Group. , p. 142
 Gilbert, Martin. (2008). Israel – A History. McNally & Loftin Publishers. . Chapter available online: Chapter 21: Nasser's Challenge .
 Goldstein, Erik (1992). Wars and Peace Treaties, 1816–1991. Routledge. 
 Haddad, Yvonne. (1992). Islamists and the "Problem of Israel": The 1967 Awakening. Middle East Journal, Vol. 46, No. 2, pp. 266–285.
 Hajjar, Sami G. The Israel-Syria Track, Middle East Policy, Volume VI, February 1999, Number 3. Retrieved 30 September 2006.
 Handel, Michael I. (1973). Israel's political-military doctrine. Center for International Affairs, Harvard University. 
 Herbert, Nicholas (17 May 1967). Egyptian Forces On Full Alert: Ready to fight for Syria. The Times, p. 1; Issue 56943; col E.
 Higham, Robin. (2003). 100 Years of Air Power and Aviation. TAMU Press. .
 Hinnebusch, Raymond A. (2003). The international politics of the Middle East. Manchester University Press. 
 
 Hopwood, Derek (1991). Egypt: Politics and Society. London: Routledge. 
 Hussein of Jordan (1969). My "War" with Israel. London: Peter Owen. 
 James, Laura (2005). The Nassar And His Enemies: Foreign Policy Decision Making In Egypt On The Eve Of The Six Day War. The Middle East Review of International Affairs. Volume 9, No. 2, Article 2.
 Jia, Bing Bing. (1998). The Regime of Straits in International Law  (Oxford Monographs in International Law). Oxford University Press, USA. .
 Katz, Samuel M. (1991) Israel's Air Force; The Power Series. Motorbooks International Publishers & Wholesalers, Osceola, WI.
 Koboril, Iwao and Glantz, Michael H. (1998). Central Eurasian Water Crisis. United Nations University Press. 
 
 Lavoy, Peter R.; Sagan, Scott Douglas & Wirtz, James J. (Eds.) (2000). Planning the Unthinkable: How New Powers Will Use Nuclear, Biological, and Chemical Weapons. Cornell University Press. .
 Leibler, Isi (1972). The Case For Israel. Australia: The Executive Council of Australian Jewry. .
 Little, Douglas. "Nasser Delenda Est: Lyndon Johnson, The Arabs, and the 1967 Six-Day War," in H.W. Brands, ed. The foreign policies of Lyndon Johnson : beyond Vietnam (1999) pp 145-167. online
 Lyndon Baines Johnson Library. (1994). Transcript, Robert S. McNamara Oral History, Special Interview I, 26 March 1993, by Robert Dallek, Internet Copy, LBJ Library. Retrieved 20 July 2010.
 Makiya, Kanan (1998). Republic of Fear: The Politics of Modern Iraq. University of California Press. 
 Maoz, Zeev (2006). Defending the Holy Land: A Critical Analysis of Israel's Security & Foreign Policy. The University of Michigan Press. 
 Miller, Benjamin. (2007). States, Nations, and the Great Powers: The Sources of Regional War and Peace. Cambridge University Press. 
 Morris, Benny (1997). Israel's Border Wars, 1949–1956. Oxford: Oxford University Press. 
 Murakami, Masahiro. (1995). Managing Water for Peace in the Middle East: Alternative Strategies . United Nations University Press. .
 Nordeen, Lon & Nicole, David. (1996). Phoenix over the Nile: A history of Egyptian Air Power 1932–1994. Washington DC: Smithsonian Institution. .
 Oren, Michael. (2005). The Revelations of 1967: New Research on the Six Day War and Its Lessons for the Contemporary Middle East , Israel Studies, volume 10, number 2. (Subscription required).
 Oren, Michael. (2006). "The Six-Day War", in Bar-On, Mordechai (ed.), Never-Ending Conflict: Israeli Military History. Greenwood Publishing Group. .
 Parker, Richard B. (1996). The Six-day War: A Retrospective. University Press of Florida. .
 
 Pimlott, John. (1983). Middle East Conflicts: From 1945 to the Present. Orbis. .
 Pressfield, Steven (2014). The Lion's Gate: On the Front Lines of the Six Day War. Sentinel HC, 2014. 
 Quandt, William B. (2005). Peace Process: American Diplomacy and the Arab–Israeli Conflict Since 1967. Brookings Institution Press and the University of California Press; 3 edition. 
 Quigley, John B. (2005). Case for Palestine: An International Law Perspective. Duke University Press. 
 Quigley, John B. (1990). Palestine and Israel: A Challenge to Justice. Duke University Press. 
 Rabil, Robert G. (2003). Embattled Neighbors: Syria, Israel, and Lebanon. Lynne Rienner Publishers. 
 Rabin, Yitzhak (1996). The Rabin Memoirs. University of California Press. .
 Rezun, Miron (1990). "Iran and Afghanistan." In A. Kapur (Ed.). Diplomatic Ideas and Practices of Asian States (pp. 9–25). Brill Academic Publishers. 
 Rikhye, Indar Jit (1980). The Sinai Blunder. London: Routledge. 
 Robarge, David S. (2007). Getting It Right: CIA Analysis of the 1967 Arab-Israeli War , Center for the Study of Intelligence, Vol. 49 No. 1
 Rubenberg, Cheryl A. (1989). Israel and the American National Interest. University of Illinois Press. 
 Sadeh, Eligar (1997). Militarization and State Power in the Arab–Israeli Conflict: Case Study of Israel, 1948–1982. Universal Publishers. 
 Sandler, Deborah; Aldy, Emad & Al-Khoshman Mahmoud A. (1993). Protecting the Gulf of Aqaba. – A regional environmental challenge. Environmental Law Institute. 0911937463.
 Seale, Patrick (1988). Asad: The Struggle for Peace in the Middle East. University of California Press. 
 
 Shafqat, Saeed (2004). Islamic world and South Asia: Rise of Islamism and Terror, Causes and Consequences?. In Kaniz F. Yusuf (Ed.) Unipolar World & The Muslim States. Islamabad: Pakistan Forum, pp 217–246.
 Shemesh, Moshe (2008). Arab Politics, Palestinian Nationalism and the Six Day War. Sussex Academic Press. .
 Smith, Grant (2006). Deadly Dogma. Institute for Research: Middle Eastern Policy. 
 
 Stein, Janice Gross. (1991). The Arab-Israeli War of 1967: Inadvertent War Through Miscalculated Escalation, in Avoiding War: Problems of Crisis Management, Alexander L. George, ed. Boulder: Westview Press.
 Stephens, Robert H. (1971). Nasser: A Political Biography. London: Allen Lane/The Penguin Press. 
 
 United Nations (967, 5 June). 1347 Security Council MEETING : June 5, 1967. Provisional agenda (S/PV.1347/Rev.1). On a subpage of the website of The United Nations Information System on the Question of Palestine (UNISPAL).
 van Creveld, Martin (2004). Defending Israel: A Controversial Plan Toward Peace. Thomas Dunne Books. 
 
 "Mediterranean Eskadra ". (September 7, 2000). Federation of American Scientists.

External links 

 The Photograph: A Search for June 1967. Retrieved 17 July 2010.
 The three soldiers – background to that photograph
 Six Day War Personal recollections & Timeline
 
 
 
 "Six-Day War" in the Encyclopaedia of the Orient
 All State Department documents related to the crisis
 Letters from David Ben-Gurion on the Six-Day War  Shapell Manuscript Foundation
 UN Resolution 242. Retrieved 17 July 2010.
 The status of Jerusalem, United Nations, New York, 1997 (Prepared for, and under the guidance of, the Committee on the Exercise of the Inalienable Rights of the Palestinian People)
 Status of Jerusalem: Legal Aspects. Retrieved 22 July 2014.
 Legal Aspects: The Six Day War – June 1967 and Its Aftermath – Professor Gerald Adler
 General Uzi Narkiss  – A historic radio interview with General Uzi Narkiss taken on 7 June – one day after the Six-Day War, describing the battle for Jerusalem
 Liberation of the Temple Mount and Western Wall by Israel Defense Forces – Historic Live Broadcast on Voice of Israel Radio, 7 June 1967
 "How the USSR Planned to Destroy Israel in 1967" by Isabella Ginor. Published by the journal Middle East Review of International Affairs (MERIA), Volume 7, Number 3 (September 2003)
 Position of Arab forces May 1967. Retrieved 22 July 2014.

 
1967 in Egypt
1967 in Israel
1967 in Jordan
1967 in Syria
1967 in the Israeli Military Governorate
Arab–Israeli conflict
Articles containing video clips
Cold War conflicts
Conflicts in 1967
Invasions by Israel
Invasions of Syria
Invasions of Egypt
June 1967 events in Asia
Six-day events
Wars involving Egypt
Wars involving Israel
Wars involving Jordan
Wars involving Syria
June 1967 events in Africa